The KNVB Beker, branded as the TOTO KNVB Beker for sponsorship reasons, is a competition in the Netherlands organized by the Royal Dutch Football Association (KNVB) since 1898. It was based on the format of the English FA Cup. Outside the Netherlands, it is often referred to as the Dutch Cup. The tournament consists of all teams from the top four tiers of Dutch league football (Eredivisie, Eerste Divisie, Tweede Divisie and Derde Divisie), as well as the 24 semi-finalists (or replacements) of the six KNVB District Cups. The finals of the tournament traditionally takes place in De Kuip, and has been held there every season since the 1989 final. The winners of the cup compete against the winners of the Eredivisie for the Johan Cruyff Shield, which acts as the curtain raiser for the following season.

History
The competition was conceived during a board meeting of the Dutch Football Association, in The Hague, on 19 January 1898. The tournament began the following season, 1898–99. The first final was played on 9 May 1899 between RAP Amsterdam and HVV Den Haag, and ended in a 1–0 victory for the former thanks to a goal from Julius Hisgen in extra-time. In 1946, the trophy was changed to one made out of silver, which was extremely rare in the immediate aftermath of World War II. That trophy remains in use today. In 2018, a trophy colored in gold was commissioned to commemorate the 100th edition of the tournament.

Name changes
Like many national cup competitions, the name of the tournament has changed with sponsorship. From 1995, the competition went from being the KNVB Beker to being known as the Amstel Cup after the then sponsor Amstel. On 16 August 2005, the name was changed to the Gatorade Cup after the drinks company Gatorade. In 2006, the name returned to being the KNVB Beker with Gatorade remaining as the principal sponsor.

On 12 January 2018, it was announced that TOTO would be the name sponsor of the KNVB Cup, until the 2021–22 season. The competition was renamed the TOTO KNVB Beker with immediate effect.

European competition
Up until 1998, the winner of the cup entered into the UEFA Cup Winners' Cup, but with the abandonment of that tournament, the winner now goes into the UEFA Europa League. If the winning team has finished in the top two of the Eredivisie and thus gained entry into the UEFA Champions League, the berth will be redistributed to that season's Eredivisie.

In 1998, both KNVB Cup finalists, Ajax and PSV, gained entry in the Champions League, so a third-place play-off was played between the beaten semi-finalists, SC Heerenveen and FC Twente, to determine who would take the Cup Winners' Cup place.

Past finals

Number of titles

Notes

Media coverage
The broadcast rights are included in the KNVB broadcast rights package, which also include the Johan Cruyff Shield.

Netherlands 
The KNVB Cup is currently broadcast live by the ESPN channels.

International

References

External links 

KNVB.nl - Official website KNVB 
Netherlands Cup Finals, RSSSF.com
Netherlands Cup Full Results 1970–1994, RSSSF.com
Minnows in Cup Finals, RSSSF.com
League321.com - National cup results. 
:fr:Coupe des Pays-Bas de football 

 
Netherlands
Football competitions in the Netherlands
Recurring sporting events established in 1899
1899 establishments in the Netherlands